Aryan Srinivasan (born 14 October 1982), known as Aryan Shiva, is an Indian actor  who has worked predominantly in the Tamil movie industry. He made his debut role in Dreams (2004).

Early life and career
Between 1995 and 2004, Aryan performed in many stage dramas in Mumbai. In 2004, he made his debut role in Dreams with Dhanush. Later he was popularly known as Pan parag Ravi - Aryan after he played a role in Thirupachi (2005) with Vijay.

Filmography

References

Male actors in Tamil cinema
Living people
1974 births
People from Vellore